Předotice is a municipality and village in Písek District in the South Bohemian Region of the Czech Republic. It has about 600 inhabitants.

Administrative parts
Villages and hamlets of Kožlí u Čížové, Křešice, Malčice, Podolí II, Šamonice, Soběšice, Třebkov and Vadkovice are administrative parts of Předotice.

References

Villages in Písek District